The 1961 Minnesota Golden Gophers football team represented the University of Minnesota in the 1961 Big Ten Conference football season. In their eighth year under head coach Murray Warmath, the Golden Gophers were 7–2 in the regular season and won the Rose Bowl, 21–3 over UCLA; Minnesota outscored their opponents 161–78. The Golden Gophers finished sixth in both final polls (Associated Press (AP) writers poll and United Press International (UPI) coaches poll), released in early December, prior to the bowl games.
 
Quarterback Sandy Stephens received the team's most valuable player award, was a consensus first-team All-American, finished fourth in the Heisman Trophy voting, was named Rose Bowl MVP, and received the Chicago Tribune Silver Football, given to the Big Ten's most valuable player. Tackle Bobby Bell was also named a first-team All-American by the FWAA, AFCA, Sporting News, and Central Press. Fullback Judge Dickson and offensive lineman Jim Wheeler were named Academic All-Big Ten.

Total attendance at six home games was 366,491, an average of 61,081, and the season high was against Purdue on November 18.

Days after the conclusion of the regular season, the faculty council at Ohio State University voted down participation in the Rose Bowl, and the berth went to Minnesota.

Schedule

Roster
 Carl Eller, Soph.
 QB Sandy Stephens

References

External links
 Sports Reference – 1961 Minnesota football season

Minnesota
Minnesota Golden Gophers football seasons
Rose Bowl champion seasons
Minnesota Golden Gophers football